The Royals Sports Television Network (RSTN) was a regional sports network serving the Kansas City area, Kansas, western Missouri, Nebraska, Oklahoma, and Iowa owned by the Kansas City Royals. The network began operations before the 2003 Major League Baseball season in response to Fox Sports Midwest's decision to reduce the number of Royals games it broadcast. RSTN had trouble getting widespread carriage by cable systems in the area and had no satellite carriage. However, the Royals began the season with good form and RSTN was able to make a deal with Fox Sports Midwest in June to redistribute most of their broadcasts. RSTN ceased operations after the 2007 season, with the Royals moving to the new channel Fox Sports Kansas City in 2008.

The Royals Insider weekly magazine show won a Regional Emmy Award in 2005 for Best Sports Program.

References

Defunct local cable stations in the United States
Major League Baseball on television
Television channels and stations established in 2003
2003 establishments in Missouri
Television channels and stations disestablished in 2007
2007 disestablishments in Missouri
Defunct mass media in Missouri
Defunct mass media in Oklahoma
Defunct mass media in Nebraska
Defunct mass media in Iowa
Defunct mass media in Kansas